Lofos ("hill") may refer to several settlements in Greece:

Lofos, Achaea, a village in Aigialeia 
Lofos, Chania, a village in Kantanos-Selino 
Lofos, Elassona, a village and a community in Elassona 
Lofos, Farsala, a village in Farsala 
Lofos, Pieria, a village and a community in Katerini